The 1957-58 Botola is 2nd season of the Moroccan Premier League. Kawkab Marrakech are the holders of the title.

References
Morocco 1957/58

Botola seasons
Morocco
Botola